State Road 419 (SR 419) is a state highway in Seminole County, in Central Florida, United States.

History
SR 203 was defined without a number by 1931 state law, chapter 14921, approved May 29, 1931:

In the 1945 renumbering, SR 203 became State Road 419.

Major intersections

References

External links

419
419
419
419